Pieces of a Man are a musical group from Manchester, UK. The band's music is a blend of future soul, funk, hip hop, jazz, formed from a mix of live organic elements, loops and samples. They are signed to the Tru Thoughts record label and have released one studio album and one extended play recording since their signing in 2018.

History 
Pieces of a Man (POAM) was formed in early 2013 by musical director and producer lllya "Pils" Gosling, together with DJ and visual artist David "DK" Klein, together with keyboardist Pete Robinson (Riot Jazz) and four female vocalists; Julie E. Gordon, Jo Fidler, Su Durant and Caz Gosling. Pils coined the band name having been reminded of the Chicago jazz poet and "bluesologist" Gil Scott-Heron's death, and the band's musicality has paid homage to him throughout their career.

Tolu "To!u" Ajayi initially replaced one of the original four singers, later becoming frontman on departure of the other three vocalists in summer 2013. Tim Curry & Mark Parkinson joined the band via advertising and witnessing live performances respectively. After the release of their debut mixtape the band were soon noticed and supported by several promoters including BBC Introducing, Mike Chadwick (Snarky Puppy) and Lubi Jovanovic (Soul Rebels). That same year POAM opened for internationally renowned neo-soul artists Bilal & Omar Lye-Fook, cementing their place in the UK live soul circuit.

In 2016, following the success of their appearances on The Funk Apostles UK tour, POAM started to write and record demos for what would eventually become their debut album. A chance meeting between DK and producer Zed Bias in 2017 eventually lead to Zed collaborating with the band to produce the record, ultimately leading to Tru Thoughts signing the band in 2018. In 2019, Pieces of a Man released Made In Pieces, and in 2020 the follow up release Reframed EP, both records and associated singles signed to and distributed by Tru Thoughts.

Thematically, POAM's releases have centred around themes of relationship and identity; personal, political and intersectional. Pils is the principal songwriter for the band, with all six members listed with writing credits. To!u is an outspoken advocate for platforming LGBT+ people of colour, his contributions and lyricism often stem from his activism.

Discography

Studio albums

Extended plays

Singles

Mixtapes

Music videos

References

External links 

 Pieces of a Man official website
 Pieces of a Man artist profile at Tru Thoughts

Pieces of a Man
Pieces of a Man
Pieces of a Man
Neo soul albums
Tru Thoughts artists
Soul musicians
Manchester-related lists
English soul musicians
Musical groups from Manchester
Queer musicians
English LGBT musicians
2013 establishments in England